The Annonay International Film Festival is an annual film festival held in Annonay, France. It was launched in 1984 and has been held every year in February. The film voted by a jury as the best in the competition section receives the Grand Jury Prize.

References

External links
 
 

Film festivals in France
Film festivals established in 1984
1984 establishments in France